Periodinanes also known as λ5-iodanes are organoiodine compounds with iodine in the +5 oxidation state. These compounds are described as hypervalent because the iodine center has more than 8 valence electrons.

Periodinane compounds
The λ5-iodanes such as the Dess-Martin periodinane have square pyramidal geometry with 4 heteroatoms in basal positions and one apical phenyl group.

Iodoxybenzene or iodylbenzene, is a known oxidizing agent. 
 
Dess-Martin periodinane (1983) is another powerful oxidant and an improvement of the IBX acid already in existence in 1983. The IBX acid is prepared from 2-iodobenzoic acid and potassium bromate and sulfuric acid and is insoluble in most solvents whereas the Dess-Martin reagent prepared from reaction of the IBX acid with acetic anhydride is very soluble. The oxidation mechanism ordinarily consists of a ligand exchange reaction followed by a reductive elimination.

Uses
The predominant use of periodinanes is as oxidizing reagents replacing toxic reagents based on heavy metals.

See also
 Carbonyl oxidation with hypervalent iodine reagents

References

External links 
Hypervalent Iodine Chemistry

Oxidizing agents